Jo Se-ho (born August 9, 1982) is a South Korean comedian.

Discography

Singles 
 2007: Trun It Up (1집 Turn It On!!!)
 2013: Guest House Project No. 1312 (게스트하우스 프로젝트 1312호) with 
 2019: Where are You Now (거기 지금 어디야) with Nam Chang-hee, Prod. Rocoberry
 2019: Doesn't Matter Where We Live (좋은 집이 무슨 상관이에요) with 
 2020: What's Wrong (바보야 왜그래) with 

Filmography

Music Videos

TV series

Television show

Web shows

Awards

State honors

References

External links 
 

1982 births
Living people
South Korean male television actors
South Korean comedians
Infinite Challenge members